Daniela Gini (born 14 August 1977 Rome) is an Italian rugby union player. She played in the number 8 position, of third and second row, for the Italian national team  .

Career 
In 1993, at the age of 16, she made his debut in the Italian national team, in Rovigo against France . After 7 seasons in Rugby Roma, she moved to CUS Roma , only to return after six years to his original club; due to the economic crisis that closed the women's section in 2007. She went with many teammates to the newly established Red & Blu , a provincial team based in Colleferro , where she became captain. In 2010, at the age of 33, she retired .

With the national team, she played at the 1998 Women's Rugby World Cup, and 2002 Women's Rugby World Cup. Apart from her motherhood, the only other interruption of her career was due to an injury  in November 2005, when she broke her ankle and fibula scoring a try.

Personal life 
She is an accountant. She married Vincenzo Biondi; they have a daughter.

References 

1977 births
Italian rugby union players
Living people
Sportspeople from Rome